The 1965 Wightman Cup was the 37th edition of the annual women's team tennis competition between the United States and Great Britain. It was held outdoors on clay at the 6,000-seat Harold T. Clark Stadium in Cleveland, Ohio, United States. This stadium had been purpose-built in 1964 to host the Challenge Round of the Davis Cup.

References

1965
1965 in tennis
1965 in American tennis
1965 in British sport
1965 in women's tennis
1965 in sports in Ohio